The 1st constituency of the Pyrénées-Atlantique is a French legislative constituency in the Pyrénées-Atlantiques département. Like the other 576 French constituencies, it elects one MP using the two-round system, with a run-off if no candidate receives over 50% of the vote in the first round.

Assembly members

Election results

2022

 
 
 
 
 
 
 
|-
| colspan="8" bgcolor="#E9E9E9"|
|-

2017

|- style="background-color:#E9E9E9;text-align:center;"
! colspan="2" rowspan="2" style="text-align:left;" | Candidate
! rowspan="2" colspan="2" style="text-align:left;" | Party
! colspan="2" | 1st round
! colspan="2" | 2nd round
|- style="background-color:#E9E9E9;text-align:center;"
! width="75" | Votes
! width="30" | %
! width="75" | Votes
! width="30" | %
|-
| style="background-color:" |
| style="text-align:left;" | Josy Poueyto
| style="text-align:left;" | Democratic Movement
| MoDem
| 
| 39.87
| 
| 62.72
|-
| style="background-color:" |
| style="text-align:left;" | Pauline Roy
| style="text-align:left;" | The Republicans
| LR
| 
| 14.88
| 
| 37.28
|-
| style="background-color:" |
| style="text-align:left;" | Jérôme Marbot
| style="text-align:left;" | Socialist Party
| PS
| 
| 12.51
| colspan="2" style="text-align:left;" |
|-
| style="background-color:" |
| style="text-align:left;" | Séverine Ghedjati
| style="text-align:left;" | La France Insoumise
| FI
| 
| 12.44
| colspan="2" style="text-align:left;" |
|-
| style="background-color:" |
| style="text-align:left;" | Claudie Cheyroux
| style="text-align:left;" | National Front
| FN
| 
| 8.90
| colspan="2" style="text-align:left;" |
|-
| style="background-color:" |
| style="text-align:left;" | Olivier Dartigolles
| style="text-align:left;" | Communist Party
| PCF
| 
| 4.62
| colspan="2" style="text-align:left;" |
|-
| style="background-color:" |
| style="text-align:left;" | Thérèse De Boissezon
| style="text-align:left;" | Regionalist
| REG
| 
| 2.12
| colspan="2" style="text-align:left;" |
|-
| style="background-color:" |
| style="text-align:left;" | Frédéric Pic
| style="text-align:left;" | Miscellaneous Left
| DVG
| 
| 1.56
| colspan="2" style="text-align:left;" |
|-
| style="background-color:" |
| style="text-align:left;" | Philippe Krompholtz
| style="text-align:left;" | Debout la France
| DLF
| 
| 1.19
| colspan="2" style="text-align:left;" |
|-
| style="background-color:" |
| style="text-align:left;" | Agnès Hegoburu
| style="text-align:left;" | Far Left
| EXG
| 
| 0.80
| colspan="2" style="text-align:left;" |
|-
| style="background-color:" |
| style="text-align:left;" | Elisabeth Meitner
| style="text-align:left;" | Independent
| DIV
| 
| 0.74
| colspan="2" style="text-align:left;" |
|-
| style="background-color:" |
| style="text-align:left;" | Djémory Diabaté
| style="text-align:left;" | Miscellaneous Left
| DVG
| 
| 0.37
| colspan="2" style="text-align:left;" |
|-
| colspan="8" style="background-color:#E9E9E9;"|
|- style="font-weight:bold"
| colspan="4" style="text-align:left;" | Total
| 
| 100%
| 
| 100%
|-
| colspan="8" style="background-color:#E9E9E9;"|
|-
| colspan="4" style="text-align:left;" | Registered voters
| 
| style="background-color:#E9E9E9;"|
| 
| style="background-color:#E9E9E9;"|
|-
| colspan="4" style="text-align:left;" | Blank/Void ballots
| 
| 1.46%
| 
| 17.90%
|-
| colspan="4" style="text-align:left;" | Turnout
| 
| 52.89%
| 
| 43.57%
|-
| colspan="4" style="text-align:left;" | Abstentions
| 
| 47.11%
| 
| 56.43%
|-
| colspan="8" style="background-color:#E9E9E9;"|
|- style="font-weight:bold"
| colspan="6" style="text-align:left;" | Result
| colspan="2" style="background-color:" | MoDEM GAIN FROM PS
|}

2012

|- style="background-color:#E9E9E9;text-align:center;"
! colspan="2" rowspan="2" style="text-align:left;" | Candidate
! rowspan="2" colspan="2" style="text-align:left;" | Party
! colspan="2" | 1st round
! colspan="2" | 2nd round
|- style="background-color:#E9E9E9;text-align:center;"
! width="75" | Votes
! width="30" | %
! width="75" | Votes
! width="30" | %
|-
| style="background-color:" |
| style="text-align:left;" | Martine Lignieres Cassou
| style="text-align:left;" | Socialist Party
| PS
| 
| 37.61
| 
| 57.64
|-
| style="background-color:" |
| style="text-align:left;" | Nicholas Patriarche
| style="text-align:left;" | Union for a Popular Movement
| UMP
| 
| 23.27
| 
| 42.36
|-
| style="background-color:" |
| style="text-align:left;" | Philippe Boell
| style="text-align:left;" | National Front
| FN
| 
| 10.25
| colspan="2" style="text-align:left;" |
|-
| style="background-color:" |
| style="text-align:left;" | Olivier Dartigolles
| style="text-align:left;" | Left Front
| FG
| 
| 8.83
| colspan="2" style="text-align:left;" |
|-
| style="background-color:" |
| style="text-align:left;" | Philippe Arraou
| style="text-align:left;" | Centrist
| CEN
| 
| 7.61
| colspan="2" style="text-align:left;" |
|-
| style="background-color:" |
| style="text-align:left;" | Danièle Iriart
| style="text-align:left;" | The Greens
| LV
| 
| 5.02
| colspan="2" style="text-align:left;" |
|-
| style="background-color:" |
| style="text-align:left;" | Thibault Cheneviere
| style="text-align:left;" | Radical Party
| PRV
| 
| 2.11
| colspan="2" style="text-align:left;" |
|-
| style="background-color:" |
| style="text-align:left;" | Mehdi Jabrane
| style="text-align:left;" | Other
| AUT
| 
| 1.31
| colspan="2" style="text-align:left;" |
|-
| style="background-color:" |
| style="text-align:left;" | Eric Schatz
| style="text-align:left;" | Far Left
| EXG
| 
| 0.88
| colspan="2" style="text-align:left;" |
|-
| style="background-color:" |
| style="text-align:left;" | Margua Ruland
| style="text-align:left;" | Ecologist
| ECO
| 
| 0.84
| colspan="2" style="text-align:left;" |
|-
| style="background-color:" |
| style="text-align:left;" | Julien Prat
| style="text-align:left;" | Other
| AUT
| 
| 0.75
| colspan="2" style="text-align:left;" |
|-
| style="background-color:" |
| style="text-align:left;" | Michèle Martin
| style="text-align:left;" | Far Left
| EXG
| 
| 0.59
| colspan="2" style="text-align:left;" |
|-
| style="background-color:" |
| style="text-align:left;" | David Vitini
| style="text-align:left;" | Miscellaneous Right
| DVD
| 
| 0.47
| colspan="2" style="text-align:left;" |
|-
| style="background-color:" |
| style="text-align:left;" | Jean Pichai
| style="text-align:left;" | Centrist
| CEN
| 
| 0.46
| colspan="2" style="text-align:left;" |
|-
| colspan="8" style="background-color:#E9E9E9;"|
|- style="font-weight:bold"
| colspan="4" style="text-align:left;" | Total
| 
| 100%
| 
| 100%
|-
| colspan="8" style="background-color:#E9E9E9;"|
|-
| colspan="4" style="text-align:left;" | Registered voters
| 
| style="background-color:#E9E9E9;"|
| 
| style="background-color:#E9E9E9;"|
|-
| colspan="4" style="text-align:left;" | Blank/Void ballots
| 
| 2.33%
| 
| 5.95%
|-
| colspan="4" style="text-align:left;" | Turnout
| 
| 58.13%
| 
| 55.90%
|-
| colspan="4" style="text-align:left;" | Abstentions
| 
| 41.87%
| 
| 44.10%
|-
| colspan="8" style="background-color:#E9E9E9;"|
|- style="font-weight:bold"
| colspan="6" style="text-align:left;" | Result
| colspan="2" style="background-color:" | PS HOLD
|}

2007

|- style="background-color:#E9E9E9;text-align:center;"
! colspan="2" rowspan="2" style="text-align:left;" | Candidate
! rowspan="2" colspan="2" style="text-align:left;" | Party
! colspan="2" | 1st round
! colspan="2" | 2nd round
|- style="background-color:#E9E9E9;text-align:center;"
! width="75" | Votes
! width="30" | %
! width="75" | Votes
! width="30" | %
|-
| style="background-color:" |
| style="text-align:left;" | Martine Lignieres Cassou
| style="text-align:left;" | Socialist Party
| PS
| 
| 36.01
| 
| 55.52
|-
| style="background-color:" |
| style="text-align:left;" | Bernard Layre
| style="text-align:left;" | Union for a Popular Movement
| UMP
| 
| 34.27
| 
| 44.48
|-
| style="background-color:" |
| style="text-align:left;" | Philippe Arraou
| style="text-align:left;" | UDF-Democratic Movement
| UDF-MoDem
| 
| 16.00
| colspan="2" style="text-align:left;" |
|-
| style="background-color:" |
| style="text-align:left;" | Bernard Laclau-Lacrouts
| style="text-align:left;" | The Greens
| LV
| 
| 3.05
| colspan="2" style="text-align:left;" |
|-
| style="background-color:" |
| style="text-align:left;" | Jacques Henriot
| style="text-align:left;" | National Front
| FN
| 
| 2.79
| colspan="2" style="text-align:left;" |
|-
| style="background-color:" |
| style="text-align:left;" | Danielle Raucoules
| style="text-align:left;" | Communist Party
| PCF
| 
| 2.05
| colspan="2" style="text-align:left;" |
|-
| style="background-color:" |
| style="text-align:left;" | Alain Garcia
| style="text-align:left;" | Far Left
| EXG
| 
| 1.85
| colspan="2" style="text-align:left;" |
|-
| style="background-color:" |
| style="text-align:left;" | Sylvia Benoist-Heurtebize
| style="text-align:left;" | Movement for France
| MPF
| 
| 1.18
| colspan="2" style="text-align:left;" |
|-
| style="background-color:" |
| style="text-align:left;" | Frédéric Pic
| style="text-align:left;" | Far Left
| EXG
| 
| 0.90
| colspan="2" style="text-align:left;" |
|-
| style="background-color:" |
| style="text-align:left;" | Michèle Boucau
| style="text-align:left;" | Hunting, Fishing, Nature and Traditions
| CPNT
| 
| 0.84
| colspan="2" style="text-align:left;" |
|-
| style="background-color:" |
| style="text-align:left;" | Dominique Mialocq
| style="text-align:left;" | Independent
| DIV
| 
| 0.68
| colspan="2" style="text-align:left;" |
|-
| style="background-color:" |
| style="text-align:left;" | Antoine Missier
| style="text-align:left;" | Far Left
| EXG
| 
| 0.39
| colspan="2" style="text-align:left;" |
|-
| colspan="8" style="background-color:#E9E9E9;"|
|- style="font-weight:bold"
| colspan="4" style="text-align:left;" | Total
| 
| 100%
| 
| 100%
|-
| colspan="8" style="background-color:#E9E9E9;"|
|-
| colspan="4" style="text-align:left;" | Registered voters
| 
| style="background-color:#E9E9E9;"|
| 
| style="background-color:#E9E9E9;"|
|-
| colspan="4" style="text-align:left;" | Blank/Void ballots
| 
| 1.48%
| 
| 3.23%
|-
| colspan="4" style="text-align:left;" | Turnout
| 
| 63.74%
| 
| 64.62%
|-
| colspan="4" style="text-align:left;" | Abstentions
| 
| 36.26%
| 
| 35.38%
|-
| colspan="8" style="background-color:#E9E9E9;"|
|- style="font-weight:bold"
| colspan="6" style="text-align:left;" | Result
| colspan="2" style="background-color:" | PS HOLD
|}

2002

|- style="background-color:#E9E9E9;text-align:center;"
! colspan="2" rowspan="2" style="text-align:left;" | Candidate
! rowspan="2" colspan="2" style="text-align:left;" | Party
! colspan="2" | 1st round
! colspan="2" | 2nd round
|- style="background-color:#E9E9E9;text-align:center;"
! width="75" | Votes
! width="30" | %
! width="75" | Votes
! width="30" | %
|-
| style="background-color:" |
| style="text-align:left;" | Martine Lignieres Cassou
| style="text-align:left;" | Socialist Party
| PS
| 
| 38.42
| 
| 53.10
|-
| style="background-color:" |
| style="text-align:left;" | Jean Gougy
| style="text-align:left;" | Union for a Presidential Majority
| UMP
| 
| 28.31
| 
| 46.90
|-
| style="background-color:" |
| style="text-align:left;" | Jean Arriau
| style="text-align:left;" | Miscellaneous Right
| DVD
| 
| 11.76
| colspan="2" style="text-align:left;" |
|-
| style="background-color:" |
| style="text-align:left;" | Jacques Henriot
| style="text-align:left;" | National Front
| FN
| 
| 7.79
| colspan="2" style="text-align:left;" |
|-
| style="background-color:" |
| style="text-align:left;" | Louise Mayerau
| style="text-align:left;" | The Greens
| LV
| 
| 3.32
| colspan="2" style="text-align:left;" |
|-
| style="background-color:" |
| style="text-align:left;" | Olivier Dartigolles
| style="text-align:left;" | Communist Party
| PCF
| 
| 2.32
| colspan="2" style="text-align:left;" |
|-
| style="background-color:" |
| style="text-align:left;" | Nadia Markovic
| style="text-align:left;" | Revolutionary Communist League
| LCR
| 
| 1.64
| colspan="2" style="text-align:left;" |
|-
| style="background-color:" |
| style="text-align:left;" | Philippe Arraou
| style="text-align:left;" | Independent
| DIV
| 
| 1.51
| colspan="2" style="text-align:left;" |
|-
| style="background-color:" |
| style="text-align:left;" | Severine Degonzague
| style="text-align:left;" | Hunting, Fishing, Nature and Traditions
| CPNT
| 
| 1.28
| colspan="2" style="text-align:left;" |
|-
| style="background-color:" |
| style="text-align:left;" | Gerard Rever
| style="text-align:left;" | Far Right
| EXD
| 
| 0.84
| colspan="2" style="text-align:left;" |
|-
| style="background-color:" |
| style="text-align:left;" | Nadege Vidal
| style="text-align:left;" | Pôle Républicain
| PR
| 
| 0.78
| colspan="2" style="text-align:left;" |
|-
| style="background-color:" |
| style="text-align:left;" | Antoine Missier
| style="text-align:left;" | Workers' Struggle
| LO
| 
| 0.77
| colspan="2" style="text-align:left;" |
|-
| style="background-color:" |
| style="text-align:left;" | Viviane Drouillard
| style="text-align:left;" | Movement for France
| MPF
| 
| 0.75
| colspan="2" style="text-align:left;" |
|-
| style="background-color:" |
| style="text-align:left;" | Georges Pachtere De
| style="text-align:left;" | National Republican Movement
| MNR
| 
| 0.49
| colspan="2" style="text-align:left;" |
|-
| style="background-color:" |
| style="text-align:left;" | Celine Houari
| style="text-align:left;" | Independent
| DIV
| 
| 0.00
| colspan="2" style="text-align:left;" |
|-
| colspan="8" style="background-color:#E9E9E9;"|
|- style="font-weight:bold"
| colspan="4" style="text-align:left;" | Total
| 
| 100%
| 
| 100%
|-
| colspan="8" style="background-color:#E9E9E9;"|
|-
| colspan="4" style="text-align:left;" | Registered voters
| 
| style="background-color:#E9E9E9;"|
| 
| style="background-color:#E9E9E9;"|
|-
| colspan="4" style="text-align:left;" | Blank/Void ballots
| 
| 1.94%
| 
| 4.02%
|-
| colspan="4" style="text-align:left;" | Turnout
| 
| 67.72%
| 
| 64.88%
|-
| colspan="4" style="text-align:left;" | Abstentions
| 
| 32.28%
| 
| 35.12%
|-
| colspan="8" style="background-color:#E9E9E9;"|
|- style="font-weight:bold"
| colspan="6" style="text-align:left;" | Result
| colspan="2" style="background-color:" | PS HOLD
|}

References

1